The 1890 Kansas gubernatorial election was held on November 4, 1890. Incumbent Republican Lyman U. Humphrey defeated People's Party nominee John F. Willits with 39.05% of the vote.

General election

Candidates
Major party candidates 
Lyman U. Humphrey, Republican
Charles L. Robinson, Democratic

Other candidates
John F. Willits, People's
A. M. Richardson, Prohibition

Results

References

1890
Kansas
Gubernatorial